The David Rinehart Anthony House, also known as the Wynne House, was a historic vernacular Greek Revival style house in Eutaw, Alabama.  The house was a two-story wood-framed building on a brick foundation. Four octagonal columns spanned the front portico.  It was built in 1860 by David Rinehart Anthony.  It was added to the National Register of Historic Places as a part of the Antebellum Homes in Eutaw Thematic Resource on April 2, 1982, due to its architectural significance.  It has since been destroyed.

References

External links
 

National Register of Historic Places in Greene County, Alabama
Houses on the National Register of Historic Places in Alabama
Greek Revival houses in Alabama
Houses completed in 1860
Demolished buildings and structures in Alabama
Houses in Greene County, Alabama
Historic American Buildings Survey in Alabama
1860 establishments in Alabama